For the Love of Mike is a 1932 British musical comedy film directed by Monty Banks and starring Bobby Howes, Constance Shotter and Arthur Riscoe. It was made at Elstree Studios by British International Pictures. The film's sets were designed by the art director David Rawnsley.

Plot

A private secretary begins to suspect that his nouveau riche employer is cheating his young female ward out of her inheritance, but inadvertently becomes involved in a plan to rob his master's safe.

Cast
 Bobby Howes as Booby Seymour  
 Constance Shotter as Mike 
 Arthur Riscoe as Conway Paton  
 Renée Macready as Stella Rees  
 Jimmy Godden as Henry Miller  
 Viola Tree as Emma Miller  
 Wylie Watson as Rev. James  
 Hal Gordon as PC 
 Syd Crossley as Sullivan  
 Monty Banks as Chef 
 Merle Oberon as Bit Part

References

Bibliography
 Low, Rachael. Filmmaking in 1930s Britain. George Allen & Unwin, 1985.
 Wood, Linda. British Films, 1927-1939. British Film Institute, 1986.

External links

1932 films
British musical comedy films
1932 musical comedy films
1930s English-language films
Films shot at British International Pictures Studios
Films directed by Monty Banks
Films set in England
British black-and-white films
1930s British films